The MacTaggart-Stewart Baronetcy, of Southwick in the Stewartry of Kirkcudbright, and Blairderry in the County of Wigtown, was a title in the Baronetage of the United Kingdom. It was created on 7 October 1892 for Mark John Stewart, who represented Wigtown Burghs and Kirkcudbrightshire in the House of Commons. The title became extinct on the death of the second Baronet in 1948.

MacTaggart-Stewart baronets, of Southwick and Blairderry (1892)
Sir Mark John McTaggart-Stewart, 1st Baronet (1834–1923)
Sir Edward Orde McTaggart-Stewart, 2nd Baronet (1883–1948)

References

Kidd, Charles, Williamson, David (editors). Debrett's Peerage and Baronetage (1990 edition). New York: St Martin's Press, 1990.

Extinct baronetcies in the Baronetage of the United Kingdom